"Dead Man's Curve" is a 1964 hit song by Jan and Dean whose lyrics detail a teen street race gone awry. It reached number eight on the Billboard Hot 100 singles chart. The song was written and composed by Brian Wilson, Artie Kornfeld, Roger Christian, and Jan Berry at Wilson's mother's house in Santa Monica. It was part of the teenage tragedy song phenomenon of that period, and one of the most popular such selections of all time. "Dead Man's Curve" was added to the Grammy Hall of Fame in 2008.

Premise
The singer goes out for a leisurely drive one night in his Corvette Sting Ray, when a driver pulls up alongside in his Jaguar XKE and challenges him to a drag race. According to the song, the race starts at Sunset and Vine, traveling westbound on West Sunset Blvd., passing North La Brea Ave., North Crescent Heights Blvd., and North Doheny Dr. The original Schwab's Pharmacy was located just east of Crescent Heights on Sunset. The North Whittier Drive curve, a nearly 90° right turn traveling west on Sunset Boulevard just past North Whittier Drive, may have been the "dead man's curve" in the song, but there is debate on the actual location of the curve. Coincidentally, Jan Berry, of Jan and Dean, would himself later be involved in a near-fatal incident in 1966, when he crashed his own Sting Ray into a parked truck on North Whittier Drive near (but not on) Dead Man's Curve.

The song ends with the singer relating his last memories of the ill-fated race to a doctor. Sound effects of screeching tires and crashing are also heard in the song. Deadman's Curve was used as the title for the 1978 biographical nationally televised movie about Jan and Dean, starring Richard Hatch and Bruce Davison respectively portraying Berry and Torrence.

Versions

Three versions of "Dead Man's Curve" were released:
Version #1: Original version from the 1963 Drag City album
Version #2: Single "hit" version with added horns, strings, additional backing vocals, and sounds of a car skidding and crashing; from the 1964 Dead Man's Curve/The New Girl In School LP
Version #3: An earlier rejected studio mix from the 1966 Filet of Soul album.

Live versions appear on the 1965 Command Performance and 1971 Anthology albums

There are a few minor lyrical differences between versions #1 and 3 and version #2 listed above:
Versions #1 & 3 – "my frenched tail lights", "the strip was deserted", and "pulled her out and there I was"
Version #2 – "my six tail lights", "the street was deserted", and "pulled her out and there we were"

There are two basic versions:

Version one: Lead and backing vocals: Jan Berry
Background vocals: Jan Berry, Brian Wilson, Gary Usher. Released: on Drag City LP, Liberty LST 7339, Jan and Dean
Jan. 6, 1964 Side one, cut five – 3:01

Also on Filet of Soul LP, Liberty LST 7441, Jan and Dean, April 25, 1966, Side two, cut three – 3:01

Version two: Jan Berry, Roger  Christian, Artie Kornfeld, Brian Wilson
Jan Berry: Lead and backing vocals. Dean Torrence: Backing vocals
Released February 17, 1964 Liberty 55672 45 RPM (B-side: "New Girl in School") – 2:28 (2:21 listing on actual disk—Wiki says 2:27)
Released May 4, 1964 "Dead Man's Curve"/"The New Girl in School" LP Liberty LST 7361, Jan and Dean Side one, cut one – 2:28
Also re-released on several compilations (the 1984 Rhino LP Teenage Tragedies lists the song as a "re-recorded version"), anthologies, and 45 RPM records (some timed 2:39)

Cover versions
The song was covered by The Carpenters as part of their oldies sequence on their album Now & Then.

The B-side "The New Girl In School" was covered by Alex Chilton on his 1995 album, A Man Called Destruction.

The song was covered by the Belljars, whose version plays over the closing credits of the 1998 film, The Curve AKA Dead Man's Curve.

This song has also been covered by Cleveland proto-punk band electric eels, Blink-182, and Canadian musician Nash the Slash.

References

External links
 Google Map of the route described in the song
 Google Map location of Jan Berry's accident
 Listen to it on YouTube

1963 songs
1963 singles
Jan and Dean songs
Teenage tragedy songs
Vehicle wreck ballads
Songs about cars
Songs written by Roger Christian (songwriter)
Songs written by Brian Wilson
Songs written by Jan Berry
Songs written by Artie Kornfeld
Songs about Los Angeles
Grammy Hall of Fame Award recipients
Liberty Records singles